Gennaro Bracigliano (born 1 March 1980) is a French former professional footballer who played as a goalkeeper.

Career
Bracigliano was born in Forbach, Moselle. He started his career with Nancy, then he transferred to Marseille in 2011. On 13 March 2012, he came on as a substitute in his UEFA Champions League debut against Inter Milan in the stoppage time, after Steve Mandanda had been dismissed. Despite conceding a goal from a penalty by Giampaolo Pazzini, he made several crucial saves which made Marseille qualify to the quarter-finals of the 2011–12 UEFA Champions League on away goals rule, after drawing 2–2 on aggregate.

On 21 August 2014, Bracigliano was a third round pick in the Inaugural ISL International Draft, signing for Chennai. He joined the North East United FC as a goalkeeping coach and player for the second season of the Indian Super League.

Personal life
His uncle Vincent Bracigliano is a former international footballer. He played for FC Metz and FC Nantes.

Honours
Marseille
Trophée des Champions: 2011
Coupe de la Ligue: 2011–12

References

External links
 Career stats at lfp.fr
 Official club profile
 Transfer to Marseille at UEFA.com

1980 births
Living people
People from Forbach
French sportspeople of Italian descent
French people of Campanian descent
Sportspeople from Moselle (department)
French footballers
Association football goalkeepers
Ligue 1 players
Ligue 2 players
Championnat National players
Indian Super League players
AS Nancy Lorraine players
Angers SCO players
Louhans-Cuiseaux FC players
Olympique de Marseille players
Chennaiyin FC players
French expatriate footballers
French expatriate sportspeople in India
Expatriate footballers in India
Footballers from Grand Est